I Supermodel 1 is the first season of the Chinese reality show and modeling competition of the same name. Filming for the show took place in Melbourne, Australia. The show featured 14 contestants in the final cast and began to air on television on March 21, 2015. The winner of the competition was 26-year-old Kang Qian Wen, better known professionally as Kiki Kang.

Contestants
(ages stated are at time of contest)

Episodes

Episode 1
First aired: March 21, 2015
		
The final fourteen part take in a fashion show with some of the season four contestants of China's Next Top Model before receiving their makeovers. They later have their first editorial photo shoot. Afterwards, they are divided into their teams and are flown to Melbourne, where they will stay for the remainder of the competition.

Team Jin Xing: Cai Hui, Chen Xi, Cui Nan, Dong Lei, Gu Ai Jia, Yao Xue Fei & Zheng Shi Hui 
Team Qi Qi: Kiki Kang, Liu Yan Hong, Ren Rui, Yang Duo Lan, Yang Liu, Zhang Hao Yue & Zhong Lu Chun

Episode 2
First aired: March 28, 2015

The fourteen finalists arrive to Australia, where the competition will take place. For the first challenge, a contestants from each team is sent to one of seven locations on a bus for a styling and photo challenge. Each model is allotted 10 minutes to get dressed and take her photo in her designated location before making it back into the bus before it drives away. Xi is disqualified for being late and missing the bus, losing the challenge for team Jin Xing. The contestants on team Qi Qi are chosen as the winners.

Challenge winners: Kiki Kang, Liu Yan Hong, Ren Rui, Yang Duo Lan, Yang Liu, Zhang Hao Yue & Zhong Lu Chun

For the shoot the girls are paired off with a contestant from the opposite team in a rugged western-themed session. 
  

Each girl is evaluated individually at panel. After receiving their feedback, the models head to separate rooms with their mentor and teammates while the judges deliberate and decide who will be eliminated. After making their decision, a judge meets each team separately to hand out the photos of the models who are safe from elimination. Yan Hong and Shi Hui are revealed to be the bottom two contestants, and they head together to the elimination room where the final photo lies face-down on a podium. The last photo is revealed to be Shi Hui's, and Yan Hong is eliminated from the competition. 
		
Best photo: Ren Rui 
Bottom two:  Liu Yan Hong & Zheng Shi Hui			
Eliminated: Liu Yan Hong

Episode 3
First aired: April 4, 2015

The contestants are given money in order to decorate shop display windows fitting certain themes. Passersby are given flowers for them to place in a bucket in front of their preferred shop window.

The girls from team Jin Xing collect the most points as a whole, becoming the winners of the challenge. As their prize for winning the challenge, they receive $3,000 for shopping.

Challenge winners: Cai Hui, Chen Xi, Linda Cui, Gu Ai Jia, Dong Lei, Yao Xue Fei & Zheng Shi Hui	

For the shoot the models are taken to the countryside, where they take part in a vintage bridal themed session with motorcyclists. After panel, the judges meet each team to reveal the models who are safe from elimination. The girls on team Qi Qi all receive photos, with Ai Jia and Shi Hiu being chosen as the bottom two. In the elimination room, the last photo is once again revealed to be Shi Hui's, and Ai Jia becomes the second girl to be eliminated.

Best photo: Chen Xi
Bottom two: Gu Ai Jia & Zheng Shi Hui
Eliminated: Gu Ai Jia

Episode 4
First aired: April 11, 2015

Challenge winners: Kiki Kang, Ren Rui, Yang Duo Lan, Yang Liu, Zhang Hao Yue & Zhong Lu Chun	
Best photo: Kiki Kang
Bottom two: Yang Liu & Zheng Shi Hui
Eliminated: Zheng Shi Hui

Episode 5
First aired: April 18, 2015

Challenge winners: Cai Hui, Chen Xi, Linda Cui, Dong Lei & Yao Xue Fei
Quit: Zhong Lu Chun	
Best photo: Kiki Kang  
Bottom two: Cai Hui & Zhang Hao Yue		 
Eliminated: Cai Hui

Episode 6
First aired: April 25, 2015

Returned: Gu Ai Jia
Best photo: Yao Xue Fei
Bottom two: Gu Ai Jia & Linda Cui	 
Eliminated: Linda Cui

Episode 7
First aired: May 2, 2015

Challenge winners: Kiki Kang, Ren Rui, Yang Duo Lan, Yang Liu & Zhang Hao Yue	
Best photo: Yao Xue Fei	 
Bottom two: Dong Lei & Ren Rui
Eliminated: Dong Lei

Episode 8
First aired: May 9, 2015	

Challenge winners: Yang Duo Lan & Yao Xue Fei	
Best photo: Yang Liu	 
Bottom three: Ren Rui, Yang Duo Lan & Zhang Hao Yue	 
Eliminated: Ren Rui & Yang Duo Lan

Episode 9
First aired: May 16, 2015	

Best photo: Kiki Kang 
Bottom two: Chen Xi & Zhang Hao Yue
Eliminated: Zhang Hao Yue

Episode 10
First aired: May 23, 2015	

Challenge winner: Yang Liu
Best photo: Kiki Kang  
Bottom two: Chen Xi & Gu Ai Jia
Eliminated: Gu Ai Jia

Episode 11
First aired: May 30, 2015	

Challenge winner: Kiki Kang 
Best photo: Kiki Kang 	 
Bottom two: Chen Xi & Yao Xue Fei	
Eliminated: Chen Xi

Episode 12
First aired: June 6, 2015	

Eliminated: Yao Xue Fei
Final two: Kiki Kang & Yang Liu	 
Winner: Kiki Kang

Summaries

Call-out order

 The contestant received best photo
 The contestant was in the danger of elimination
 The contestant was eliminated
 The contestant quit the competition
 The contestant won the competition

In episode 1, there was no elimination. The models were divided into their teams.
In episode 5, Lu Chun quit the competition after disagreeing with the results of the challenge.
In episode 6, Ai Jia returned to the competition.

Photo shoot guide
Episode 1 photo shoots: Makeovers; 'Who Am I' editorial
Episode 2 photo shoot: Western styling on a farm in pairs 
Episode 3 photo shoot: Vintage bridal  
Episode 4 photo shoot: Posing nude with handbags
Episode 5 photo shoot: Girls on vacation
Episode 6 photo shoot: Brighton bathing boxes
Episode 7 photo shoot: Dynamic posing  
Episode 8 photo shoot: Countryside couture
Episode 9 photo shoot: Australian national day
Episode 10 photo shoot: Edgy swimwear on the beach
Episode 11 photo shoot: Tribal wear in the wilderness
Episode 12 photo shoot: High fashion editorial

References

External links
Season 1 website
Weibo site
Kiki Kang on Models.com

I Supermodel
2015 Chinese television seasons